The 1974 World Sportscar Championship season was the 22nd season of FIA World Sportscar Championship motor racing.  It featured the 1974 World Championship for Makes   and FIA Cup for GT Cars  which were contested concurrently over a ten race series  from 25 April to 9 November 1974. The World Championship for Makes, which was open to Group 5 Sports Cars and Group 4 GT Cars, was won by Matra and the FIA Cup for GT Cars by Porsche.

Schedule

The 1974 World Championship for Makes and FIA Cup for GT Cars were contested concurrently over a ten race series.

Results

Races

World Championship for Makes
Points were awarded to the top 10 finishers in the order of 20-15-12-10-8-6-4-3-2-1. Makes were only awarded the applicable points for their highest finishing car, with no points awarded for positions gained by additional cars. No points were awarded for places gained by Touring Cars or by any other cars from groups which were ineligible for the championship.

Only the best seven scores for each make counted towards the championship, with any other points earned not included in the totals.

FIA Cup for GT Cars
In addition to being eligible for the overall championship, GT Cars also competed for their own award.

The cars
The following models contributed to the nett point scores of their respective makes.

World Championship for Makes
 Matra-Simca MS670 
 Gulf GR7 Ford
 Porsche Carrera, Porsche Carrera RSR & Porsche 908/3
 Alfa Romeo 33TT12
 Chevron B23 Ford & Chevron B26 Ford
 Ligier JS2 Maserati
 Lola T282 Ford, Lola T294 Ford & Lola T292 Ford
 Ferrari 365 GTB/4
 March 74S Ford
 Alpine A441 Renault
 AMS Ford
 Ecosse Ford

FIA Cup for GT Cars
 Porsche Carrera RSR
 Ferrari 365 GTB/4
 de Tomaso Pantera
 Chevrolet Corvette
 BMW 3.0 CSL

References

World Sportscar Championship seasons
World Sportscar